Claire Wright (b. 16 November 1996) is a Canadian water polo player. She plays for the Canadian national women's water polo team and played collegiately at the University of California, Berkeley.

Career highlights

Youth competitor

Senior competitor

2020 Tokyo Summer Olympics 
One of 371 Canadian athletes competing, Wright scored seven goals at her Olympic debut at the 2020 Summer Olympics in Tokyo, where Team Canada finished in 7th place.

Personal life 
Wright started playing water polo at age 9. She attends the University of California, Berkeley.

Her older sister Claire also plays for Team Canada and was a member of the Tokyo 2020 Olympic water polo team. Her uncle Jeff Beukeboom played in the NHL for the New York Rangers and Edmonton Oilers.

References 

Olympic water polo players of Canada
Canadian female water polo players
1996 births
Sportspeople from Ontario
Living people
Water polo players at the 2020 Summer Olympics